The Transfer Pak is a removable accessory for the Nintendo 64 controller that fits into its expansion port. When connected, it allows for the transfer of data between supported Nintendo 64 (N64) games and Game Boy or Game Boy Color (GBC) games. By using the Transfer Pak, players can unlock additional content in compatible games; the Pokémon Stadium games, with which the Transfer Pak was initially bundled for sale, also feature the ability to emulate specific Game Boy Pokémon titles for play on the N64.

The Transfer Pak was supported by roughly 20 N64 games worldwide, only six of which supported it outside of Japan. Several games which initially planned to utilize the accessory were either cancelled or had the functionality removed. As a result, while recognized as one of the first examples of connectivity between Nintendo's home consoles and handhelds, the Transfer Pak has come to be retrospectively regarded as largely unnecessary by members of the gaming press.

History
The Transfer Pak was first revealed at Nintendo's Space World 1997 trade show. It was released in Japan in August 1998 as a pack-in with the game Pocket Monsters' Stadium, which required the Transfer Pak for many of its features. In North America and Europe, the Transfer Pak was similarly bundled with Pokémon Stadium, which released in February and April 2000 respectively.

Unlike the Super Game Boy peripheral, which allowed Game Boy games to be played on the Super Nintendo Entertainment System, the Transfer Pak's primary use was not to play Game Boy games on the Nintendo 64. Nintendo and Intelligent Systems developed a separate accessory to serve this function, the Wide-Boy64, but it did not receive a wide release and was instead only available to game developers and members of the gaming press. However, the Pokémon Stadium games included a built-in Game Boy emulator, allowing users to play compatible Pokémon games on the N64 by inserting them into the Transfer Pak. In 2019, an independent software developer created a ROM hack of Pokémon Stadium 2 that expanded the emulator’s compatibility to include other Game Boy games.

Some games with planned Transfer Pak support went unreleased. One of these was Cabbage, a Nintendo 64DD breeding simulator game, which would have featured the Transfer Pak as a major gameplay component. The game was planned to allow players to transfer their pet to the Game Boy and continue to nurture it throughout the day. It was also suggested that special inexpensive Game Boy cartridges would contain new content, such as additional events and items, that could be transferred into Cabbage. 

Other games were intended to include Transfer Pak features during development, only to remove them prior to release. WWF No Mercy was meant to use the Transfer Pak to import points earned in its Game Boy Color counterpart, which could be spent on rewards in the Nintendo 64 game's "SmackDown Mall". However, this feature was removed following the cancellation of the GBC version. Perfect Dark was originally going to support transferring photos from the Game Boy Camera to create characters with real-life faces, but this function was removed during development, as a result of both technical issues and a wave of anti-violent video game sentiment after the Columbine High School massacre; the final version only uses the Transfer Pak to immediately unlock four of the game's cheats via Perfect Dark on GBC. The GBC version of The World Is Not Enough was initially reported to feature Transfer Pak connectivity with its N64 counterpart, allowing players to strengthen their characters in the N64 game's multiplayer mode, but this was seemingly dropped before release.

A similar accessory, the "64 GB Cable", was designed to connect a Game Boy Color to a Nintendo 64 controller port, and would allow data to be transferred from the GBC to a 64DD storage cartridge, as well as for the GBC to be used as a "sub-screen" for certain 64DD games. This was demonstrated at Space World 1999 with the 64DD game DT Bloodmasters, a trading card game that would allow for the GBC to function as a second screen using the 64 GB Cable. The cable and DT Bloodmasters were ultimately never released, though its GBC counterpart, DT: Lords of Genomes, was released in 2001. Derby Stallion 64 was also intended to support the 64 GB Cable, using the GBC as a second screen to place private bets on horse races, but this feature was removed after the accessory's cancellation.

Games 
The following is a complete list of compatible Nintendo 64 games, along with the corresponding Game Boy games.

Reception 
Contemporary reviews of the Transfer Pak praised its implementation in the Pokémon Stadium games, with some claiming that players who played the games without using it would find their appeal and features severely limited. Similarly, Peer Schneider of IGN considered the Transfer Pak functionality in PD Ultraman Battle Collection 64 to be the game's sole redeeming feature. When reviewing the Virtual Console releases of Mario Golf and Mario Tennis, Lucas M. Thomas of IGN was disappointed by the removal of Transfer Pak functionality from the rereleases, lamenting their incompleteness due to the inability to unlock their Transfer Pak-exclusive content. Some members of the press identified the Transfer Pak as an influence on later examples of connectivity between Nintendo's home consoles and handhelds, most prominently the GameCube – Game Boy Advance link cable.

However, in the years following the Nintendo 64's discontinuation, the Transfer Pak has been regarded as a largely underutilized and unnecessary add-on. In a retrospective for Nintendo Life, Gavin Lane stated that the Transfer Pak, while interesting, never truly reached its full potential. Brett Elston of GamesRadar+ claimed that many players misinterpreted the Transfer Pak as a device meant to play Game Boy games on the television, leading to disappointment. Elston also described most games' Transfer Pak integration as "an afterthought, with features that were barely worth the hassle of digging it out of the closet." Den of Geeks Daniel Kurland considered the Transfer Pak to be "a frivolity rather than something fundamental", particularly given the meager number of games that supported it. Writing for GamesBeat, André Bardin was also critical of the Transfer Pak's lack of support, particularly outside of Japan.

See also 
Nintendo 64 accessories
GameCube – Game Boy Advance link cable

References

Game Boy accessories
Nintendo 64 accessories